In Hawaiian religion, Kamohoaliʻi is a shark god and a brother of Kāne Milohaʻi, Pele, Kapo, Nāmaka, and Hiʻiaka.

Kamohoaliʻi swam in the area around the islands of Maui and Kahoolawe. When a ship was lost at sea, Ka-moho-aliʻi shook his tail in front of the fleet and the kahuna would feed him awa, a narcotic drink, and Kamohoaliʻi would guide the men home. He is sometimes said to have guided the ships of the original inhabitants of Hawaii from the mainland to their island home in this way. 

Kamohoaliʻi had the power to take on the form of any fish and is believed to own multiple underwater caves beneath the ocean where he dwells.

See also
Ukupanipo, also a Hawaiian shark god

References

Hawaiian gods
Fish gods